The  are Japanese islands in the East China Sea, off the western coast of Kyūshū. They are part of Nagasaki Prefecture.

Geography 

To the north is Tsushima Island in the Tsushima Strait and to the east is Kyūshū and the rest of Nagasaki Prefecture. The Tsushima Current (a branch of the Kuroshio) passes around the islands.

Some dome-shaped hills command the old castle town of Fukue. The islands are highly cultivated; deer and other game abound, and trout are plentiful in the mountain streams.

As a result of a merger on August 1, 2004, the city of Gotō was established. It occupies Fukue, Hisaka, and Naru islands, and seven inhabited ones. The town of Shin-Kamigotō, itself the product of a simultaneous, separate merger in 2004, occupies Nakadōri and Wakamatsu islands, two of the five main islands of the Gotō archipelago, in addition to the small inhabited islands of Arifuku, Kashiragashima, Hinoshima, Ryōzegaura, and Kirinoko and a great number of uninhabited islets.

The small island of Kabajima is east of Hisaka Island and northeast of Fukue Island. It belongs to Gotō City.

Demographics 

In 2005, there were 76,311 inhabitants on the islands. 

An important historical element is the roots of Christianity in Japan within the islands. Some of the inhabitants are descended from Christians of the Catholic Church ("Kakure Kirishitan"), who came to their faith upon the introduction of Christianity to Japan via Portuguese missionaries in the late 16th century. These Japanese were many times persecuted and tortured by the Japanese shogunates for their beliefs, all the way into the early Meiji period. Until recently Hanare Kirishitans still lived there; the majority either returned to Catholicism after it was legalized in the 19th century or reverted to earlier practices. The islands are part of the Archdiocese of Nagasaki.

Products 
Marine products, such as oysters and sea urchins, are the main products of the island. The natural camellia oil of Fukuejima is famous in Japan for cosmetic use. Cankoro-mochi, simple and traditional confections made from mochi and sliced and dried sweet potato is a kind of "soul food" for Goto natives. Cancoro-mochi is a good, inexpensive souvenir. It becomes sweeter when sliced (5 mm – 1 cm thick) and toasted in a toaster oven.

Tourism 

Fukue city is a typical jokamachi in Japan, but the most interesting point is that the old castle in Fukue (called Ishida Castle) was built last in Japanese history. The year after the castle was completed, Japan opened their nation because of the Meiji Restoration. Today, the castle is used as the Goto high school and is contributing to the education of young Goto natives. Most of the castle area inside the stone walls are opened for public, you'll be able to see even the school grounds (which is also old castle heritage) if you ask for permission from the school administration office.

Transportation
The Gotō-Fukue Airport (FUJ/RJFE) is on Fukue Island.

Ferry services from Nagasaki and Sasebo are offered by Kyusyu Shosen Co. Ltd. Both standard ferry and hydrofoil services operate.

There are also regular bus services on Fukue island.

See also
 Barakamon—Manga/Anime series set on Fukue Island.
 Diary of Our Days at the Breakwater—Manga/Anime series partially set on the islands.
 Hidden Christian Sites in the Nagasaki Region

Citations

External links

 Goto city tourism association 

Archipelagoes of Japan
Archipelagoes of the Pacific Ocean
Islands of Nagasaki Prefecture
Islands of the East China Sea
Japanese archipelago